Mount Bower is a prominent mountain,  high, standing  east-northeast of Roberts Butte in the Outback Nunataks, a minor group of nunataks situated in Victoria Land, Antarctica. The mountain was mapped by the United States Geological Survey from surveys and from U.S. Navy air photos, 1959–64, and named by the Advisory Committee on Antarctic Names for John R. Bower, ionospheric physicist at South Pole Station, 1968. The geographical feature lies situated on the Pennell Coast, a portion of Antarctica lying between Cape Williams and Cape Adare.

References

Mountains of Victoria Land
Pennell Coast